This is a list of political offices which have been held by a woman, with details of the first woman holder of each office. It is ordered by the countries in Europe and by dates of appointment. Please observe that this list is meant to contain only the first woman to hold of a political office, and not all the female holders of that office.

Albania

People's Socialist Republic
 Member of Parliament – Naxhije Dume, Liri Gega and Ollga Plumbi – 1946
 Minister of Culture, Education and Science – Nexhmije Hoxha – 1946
 Member of the Praesidium of the People's Republic of Albania – Liri Belishova – 1950
 Chairperson of the State-Planning Committee in the Council of Ministers – Petra Dode – 1972
 Minister of Agriculture – Themie Thomai – 1975
 President of the Praesidium of the People's Republic of Albania – Mine Guri – 1978
 Minister of Light Industry – Esma Ulqinaku – 1982
 Minister for Light- and Food Industry – Vito Kapo – 1982

Republic
 Foreign Minister – Arta Dade – 2001
 Deputy Prime Minister – Ermelinda Meksi – 2003
 Chairwoman of the Parliament – Jozefina Topalli – 2005
 European Integration Minister – Majlinda Bregu – 2005
 Defence Minister – Mimi Kodheli – 2013
 Education and Sport Minister – Lindita Nikolla – 2013
 Minister of Economy – Milva Ekonomi – 2015
Minister of Justice – Etilda Gjonaj – 2017

Andorra

 Councillor/Parliamentarian – Mercè Bonell – 1984
 Minister for Public Service – Mercé Sansa Renyer – 1985
 Secretary General of Tourism and Sport – Monserrat Roncheras Santacreu – 1985
 Secretary General of the Conceil Generall – Susangna Arasanz Serra – 1991
 Minister for Education, Sport and Youth – Rosa Maria Mandico Alcobe – 1994
 Minister of Finance – Susangna Arasanz Serra – 1994
 Secretary of State for Health in the Ministry of Health and Welfare – Lidia Magallon Font – 1995
 Secretary of State of Agriculture – Olga Adellach Coma – 1997
 Minister of Agriculture and Environment – Olga Adellach Coma – 1998
 Mayor of Andorra la Vella – Conxita Mora Jordana – 1999
 Minister of Health and Welfare – Mònica Codina Tort – 2001
 Foreign Minister – Meritxell Mateu i Pi – 2007
 Representative of the French Co-Prince of Andorra – Emmanuelle Mignon – 2007
 Speaker of the Parliament – Roser Suñé Pascuet – 3 May 2019

Armenia

Kingdom of Armenia
 Monarch — Erato of Armenia – 1st century BC & first half of 1st century

First Republic of Armenia 
 Member of Parliament — Katarine Zalyan-Manukyan — 1919
 Member of Parliament — Perchuhi Partizpanyan-Barseghyan — 1919
 Member of Parliament — Varvara Sahakyan — 1919

Armenian Soviet Socialist Republic 
 Deputy Premier Minister – Rema Khristoforovna Svetlova – 1975 
 Minister of Trade – Nina Asmayan – 1991

Republic of Armenia
Ombudsman – Larisa Alaverdyan – 1 March 2004
Minister of Culture — Hasmik Poghosyan – 8 June 2007
Minister of Diaspora — Hranush Hakobyan – 1 October 2008
Deputy President of National Assembly —Hermine Naghdalyan – 31 May 2012
 Leader of Prosperous Armenia Political Party – Naira Zohrabyan – 5 March 2015
Minister of Justice — Arpine Hovhannisyan – 4 September 2015
Minister of Culture — Lilit Makunts — 12 May 2018 (Pashinyan government)
Minister of Labor and Social Affairs — Mane Tandilyan — 12 May 2018 (Pashinyan government)

Austria

Imperial
 Monarch – Maria Theresia of Austria – 1740

Republic
 Member of Parliament – Anna Boschek – 1919
 President of the Bundesrat – Olga Ruder-Zeynek – 1927
 Understate secretary for Food – Helene Postranecky – 1945
 Government Minister (Minister of Social Affairs) – Grete Rehor – 1966
 Minister for Foreign Affairs – Benita Ferrero-Waldner – 2000
 Mayor of Innsbruck – Hilde Zach – 2002–2011
 Minister for Justice – Karin Gastinger – 2004 
 European Commissioner for Trade and European Neighbourhood Policy – Benita Ferrero-Waldner – 2009

Azerbaijan

Soviet Socialist Republic 
 Cabinet Minister – Ayna Sultanova – 1938
 Minister of Justice – Ayna Sultanova – 1938
 Chairperson of the Committee for Science and Technology at the Council of Ministers – Tahira Tahirova – 1957
 Minister of Education – Sakina Aliyeva – 1958
 Minister of Foreign Affairs – Tahira Tahirova – 1959
 Deputy Premier Minister – Tahira Tahirova – 1963
 Vice-President – S.M. Mamedaliyeva – 1963 
 Minister of Higher and Special Education – Zuleikha Ismail-Kyzy Guseinova – 1965
 Minister Social Affairs – L.P. Lykova – 1965 
 Head of the Central Committee Department of Agriculture – L.D. Radzhabova – 1971
 Minister of Public Service/Consumers Protection – Zuleikha Mageran Kyzy Gasanova – 1974
 Minister of Trade – Svetlana Chingvitz-Kyzy Kasimova – 1979
 Minister of Foreign Affairs – Elmira Gafarova – 1983
 Chairwoman of the Presidium of the Supreme Soviet – Elmira Gafarova – 1989
 Speaker of the National Assembly of Azerbaijan – Elmira Gafarova – 1990

Republic
 Chairwoman of the National Assembly – Elmira Gafarova – 1991
 Secretary of State – Lala Shevket – 1993
Minister of Justice – Südaba Hasanova -1995
 Vice President of Azerbaijan – Mehriban Aliyeva – 2017

Belarus

Soviet Socialist Republic
 Chairman of the Supreme Soviet – Nadezhda Grigoryevna Grekova – 1938
 Public Commisar of Education – Evdokiya Ilinichna Uralova – 1938 
 Deputy Premier Minister for Culture – Nina Leonovna Snezhkova – 1970
 Minister of Food Industry – Ionna A. Stavrovskaia – 1980

Belgium

 Count of Flanders – Margaret I – 1191
 Count of Luxembourg – Ermesinde – 1197
 Count of Hainaut – Margaret I – 1244
 Duke of Brabant – Joanna – 1355
 Duke of Burgundy – Mary of Burgundy – 1477
 Governor of the Habsburg Netherlands – Margaret of Austria – 1507
 Duke of Bouillon – Charlotte de La Marck – 1574

Kingdom
 Member of Parliament (Senate) – Marie Janson – 1921
 Mayor – Léonie Keingiaert de Gheluvelt, (Gheluvelt) – 1921
 Member of Parliament (Chamber of Representatives) – Lucie Dejardin – 1929
 Minister for Family and Housing – Marguerite De Riemaecker-Legot – 1965
 Minister for Flemish Affairs – Rika De Backer – 1974
 Mayor of Antwerp – Mathilde Schroyens – 1977
 Party leader of major political party – Antoinette Spaak – 1977
 Secretary of State for Brussels Region – Lydia De Pauw – 1979
 Secretary of State for the Dutch-speaking Community – Rika Steyeart – 1979
 Secretary of State for Environment and Social Emancipation – Miet Smet – 1985
 Secretary of State for Pensions – Leona Detiège – 1988
 Minister for Budget – Wivina Demeester – 1991
 Minister for Employment and Labour – Miet Smet – 1992
 Minister of Health – Laurette Onkelinx – 1992
 Minister-President of the French Community – Laurette Onkelinx – 1993
 Minister for Social Affairs – Magda De Galan – 1994
 Deputy Prime Minister – Laurette Onkelinx & Isabelle Durant – 1999
 Minister of Transport – Isabelle Durant – 1999
 Minister of Justice – Laurette Onkelinx – 2003
 President of the Senate – Anne-Marie Lizin – 2004
 President of the Parliament of the French Community – Isabelle Simonis – 2004
 President of the Flemish Parliament – Marleen Vanderpoorten – 2006
 European Commissioner for Employment, Social Affairs, Skills and Labour Mobility – Marianne Thyssen – 2014
 Prime Minister – Sophie Wilmès – 2019

Bosnia and Herzegovina

 Serb Member of the Presidency of Bosnia and Herzegovina – Željka Cvijanović – 2022
 Chairwoman of the Presidency of Bosnia and Herzegovina – Željka Cvijanović – 2022
 Chairwoman of the Council of Ministers – Borjana Krišto – 2023

Federation of Bosnia and Herzegovina
 President – Borjana Krišto – 2007
 Mayor of Sarajevo – Semiha Borovac – 2005

Republika Srpska 

 Minister of Finance – Petra Marković – 1992
 President – Biljana Plavšić – 1996
 Minister of Finance – Svetlana Cenić – 2004
 Vice President of Parliament – Nada Tešanović – 2006
 Deputy Prime Minister and Minister of Economic relations and Regional cooperation – Jasna Brkić – 2006
 Minister of Self-government – Lejla Rešić – 2010
 Minister of Tourism and Trade – Gorana Zlatković – 2010
 Minister of Sport and youth – Nada Tešanović – 2010
Minister of Justice – Biljana Marić – 2001 
Minister of Justice (Republika Srpska) – Gorana Zlatković – 2011 
 Minister of Planning, Civil Engineering and Ecology – Srebrenka Golić – 2010
 Minister of Economic regional relations – Željka Cvijanović – 2010
 Prime Minister – Željka Cvijanović – 2013
 Minister of Tourism and Trade – Maida Ibširagić Hrstić – 2013

Bulgaria

Kingdom
 Regent – Maria Palaiologina Kantakouzene – 1271 or Irene Komnene of Epirus – 1246 (disputed)

People's Republic
 Minister of Posts, Telegraphs and Telephones – Tsola Dragoycheva – 1947
 Deputy Minister of Finance - Vera Lukanova - 1954
 Member of the Politburo – Nadya Zenuka Vasileva Zhikova – 1961
 Minister, Chairperson of the Commission for Light Industry – Dora Pavlova – 1963
Minister of Justice – Svetla Daskalova – 1966
 Minister of Culture - Lyudmilla Zhivkova - 1975
 Minister of Education - Drazha Deleva Vulcheva - 1977

Republic
 Prime Minister (acting) – Reneta Indzhova – 1994
 Foreign minister (acting) – Irina Bokova – 1996
 European Commissioner for Consumer Protection – Meglena Kuneva – 2007
 President of the National Assembly – Tsetska Tsacheva – 2009
 Mayor of Sofia – Yordanka Fandakova – 2009

Croatia

Kingdom 
 Regent (for Stjepan Držislav) – Jelena of Zadar, Queen of Croatia – 969 (disputed)

Socialist Republic of Croatia
 Finance Minister – Anka Berus – 1945
 Prime minister – Savka Dabčević-Kučar – 1967
 President of the Presidency – Ema Derossi-Bjelajac – 1985

Republic 
 Minister for Education – Vesna Girardi-Jurkić – 1992
 President of County house of Parliament (Senate) – Katica Ivanišević – 1994
 Minister for Building and Construction – Marina Matulović-Dropulić – 1995
 Vice Prime Minister – Ljerka Mintas-Hodak – 1995
 Mayor of Zagreb – Marina Matulović-Dropulić – 1996
 Minister for European Integration – Ljerka Mintas-Hodak – 1998
 Minister for Science – Milena Žic-Fuchs – 1999
 Minister for Health – Ana Stavljenić-Rukavina – 2000
 Minister for Tourism – Pave Župan-Rusković – 2000
 Minister for Justice – Ingrid Antičević-Marinović – 2001 
Minister for Defence – Željka Antunović – 2002
 Minister without portfolio – Gordana Sobol – 2002
 Minister for Foreign Affairs – Kolinda Grabar-Kitarović – 2005
 Prime Minister – Jadranka Kosor – 2009
 Minister for Finance – Martina Dalić – 2010
 President – Kolinda Grabar-Kitarović – 2015

Cyprus

Kingdom
 Regent – Plaisance of Antioch – 1253
 Monarch – Charlotte of Cyprus – 1458

Republic
Minister of Justice and Public Order – Stella Soulioti – 1960 
Mayor of Nicosia – Eleni Mavrou – 2006
 Foreign Minister – Erato Kozakou-Marcoullis – 2007
 European Commissioner for Education, Culture, Multilingualism and Youth – Androulla Vassiliou – 2010

Northern Cyprus
unrecognized, secessionist state

 Minister of Economy and Finance – Onur Boman – 1993
 Prime Minister – Sibel Siber – 2013
 Foreign Minister – Emine Çolak – 2015

Czech Republic

Duchy of Bohemia
 Regent – Ludmila of Bohemia, Duchess Regent of Bohemia – 921

Kingdom of Bohemia
 Regent – Kunigunda of Halych, Queen Regent of Bohemia – 1278
 Monarch – Maria Theresa – 1740

Czechoslovakia (1918–1992) 
Members of the first Czechoslovak Parliament: Revolutionary National Assembly (unicameral) – Božena Ecksteinová, Anna Chlebounová, Irena Káňová, Františka Kolaříková, Luisa Landová-Štychová, Alice Masaryková, Eliška Purkyňová, Božena Viková-Kunětická, Ludmila Zatloukalová-Coufalová, Františka Zeminová – 1918
 Deputy Speaker of the National Assembly of Czechoslovakia – Anežka Hodinová-Spurná – 1945
Minister of Industry – Ludmila Jankovcová – 1947
Deputy Prime Minister – Ludmila Jankovcová – 1954
Minister of Consumer Industry – Božena Machačová-Dostálová – 1954
 Minister of Post and Telecommunication – Růžena Urbánková – 1969
 Speaker of the Chamber of People of the Federal Assembly – Soňa Pennigerová – 1969
 Deputy Speaker of the Chamber of People of the Federal Assembly – Eva Železníková – 1986
 Deputy Speaker of the Chamber of Nations of the Federal Assembly – Blanka Hyková – 1989
Minister of State Audit – Květoslava Kořínková – 1989

Czech Republic (1992–onward) 
 Deputy Speaker of the Chamber of Deputies – Petra Buzková – 1996
 Vice-President of the Senate – Jaroslava Moserová – 1996 
 Minister of Justice – Vlasta Parkanová – 1997
 Minister of Health – Zuzana Roithová – 1998
 President of the Senate – Libuše Benešová – 1998
 Minister of Education, Youth and Sport – Petra Buzková – 2002
 Minister of Information Technologies – Dana Bérová – 2005
 Minister of Agriculture – Milena Vicenová – 2006
 Minister of Culture – Helena Třeštíková – 2007
 Minister of Defense – Vlasta Parkanová – 2007
 Minister without Portfolio – Džamila Stehlíková – 2007
 Vice-President of the Senate – Alena Gajdůšková – 2008
 Governor of Plzeň Region – Milada Emmerová – 2008
 Governor of Ústí nad Labem Region – Jana Vaňhová – 2008
 Deputy Prime Minister – Vlasta Parkanová – 2009
 Minister of Environment – Rut Bízková – 2010
 Speaker of the Chamber of Deputies – Miroslava Němcová – 2010
 Governor of Central Bohemian Region – Zuzana Moravčíková – 2012
 Minister of Labour and Social Affairs – Ludmila Müllerová – 2012
 Minister of Regional Development – Věra Jourová – 2014 
 Mayor of Prague – Adriana Krnáčová – 2014
 European Commissioner for Justice and Consumers – Věra Jourová – 2014 
 Governor of Karlovy Vary Region – Jana Vildumetzová – 2016

Denmark

 Regent – Margaret Sambiria – 1259
 Monarch – Margaret I – 1387
 Minister for Education – Nina Bang – 1924
 Minister without portfolio – Fanny Jensen – 1947
 Minister for Justice – Helga Pedersen – 1950 
Ministry for Justice (Hjørring Retskreds) – Anne Mette Ovesen – 2003 
 Minister for Ecclesiastical Affairs – Bodil Koch – 1950
Mayor of Stege: Eva Madsen (1950)
 Speaker of the Landsting, Chamber of Parliament – Ingeborg Hansen – 1950
 Minister for Trade – Lis Groes – 1953
 Minister for Economy – Marianne Jelved – 1993
 European Commissioner for the Environment – Ritt Bjerregaard – 1995
 Minister of Finance – Pia Gjellerup – 2000
 Minister for Agriculture and Food – Mariann Fischer Boel – 2002
 Lord Mayor of Copenhagen – Ritt Bjerregaard – 2006
 Minister of Foreign Affairs – Lene Espersen – 2010
 Prime Minister – Helle Thorning-Schmidt – 2011
 Speaker of the Folketing – Pia Kjærsgaard – 2015

Faroe Islands

 Minister of Economy, Statistics, Transport and Justice – Jóngerð Purkhús – 1989–1991
Prime Minister – Marita Petersen – 1993
 Speaker of the Løgting – Marita Petersen – 1994
 High Commissioner – Vibeke Larsen −1995

Greenland

 Foreign minister – Aleqa Hammond – 2007
 Speaker of the Inatsisartut – Ruth Heilmann – 2008
 High Commissioner – Mikaela Engell – 2011
 Prime Minister – Aleqa Hammond – 2013

Estonia

Danish Estonia
 Regent – Margaret Sambiria of Denmark – 1259

Swedish Estonia and Livonia
 Monarch – Christina of Sweden – 1632

Autonomous Governorate of Estonia
 Member of the Provincial Assembly – Anna Leetsmann – 1917

Republic of Estonia
 Members of the Constituent Assembly – Emma Asson-Petersen, Marie Helene Aul, Minni Kurs-Olesk, Alma Ostra-Oinas, Johanna Päts, Helmi Press-Jansen and Marie Reisik – 1919
 Members of the Riigikogu – Emma Asson-Petersen and Alma Ostra-Oinas – 1920
 Members of the National Assembly – Linda Marie Eenpalu and Alma Jeets – 1937
 Member of National Council (Second Chamber) – Linda Marie Eenpalu – 1938

Estonian Soviet Socialist Republic
 Minister of Social Welfare – Olga Lauristin – 1944
 Minister of Social Security – Erna Visk – 1958 
 Minister of Public Service – Meta Vannas (Jangolenko) – 1967
 Minister of Education – Elsa Gretškina – 1985
 Party leader – Lagle Parek of the National Independence Party – 1988
 Minister of Social Welfare – Siiri Oviir – 1990

Estonian Government in Exile
 Minister without portfolio (in Exile) – Renate Kaasik – 1971
 Secretary of State (in Exile) – Katrin Nyman-Metcalf – 1990
 Minister of Justice (in Exile) – Aino Lepik von Wirén – 1990

Republic of Estonia
 Minister of Internal Affairs – Lagle Parek – 1992
 Minister of Social Affairs – Marju Lauristin – 1992
 Minister of Reforms – Liia Hänni – 1994
 Minister of Economic Affairs – Liina Tõnisson – 1995
 Mayor of Tallinn – Ivi Eenmaa – 1995
 Minister of Culture – Signe Kivi – 1999
 Minister of Foreign Affairs – Kristiina Ojuland – 2002
 Minister of Education – Mailis Rand – 2002
 County Governor (Tartu County) – Eha Pärn – 2003 (acting governor until 2004)
 President of the Riigikogu – Ene Ergma – 2003
 Mayor of Tartu – Laine Jänes – 2003
 Minister of Agriculture – Ester Tuiksoo – 2004
 Members of the European Parliament – Marianne Mikko and Siiri Oviir – 2004
 Minister of Population Affairs – Urve Palo – 2007
 Minister of Environment – Keit Pentus – 2011
 Minister of Foreign Trade and Entrepreneurship – Anne Sulling – 2014
 Minister of Finance – Maris Lauri – 2014
 Chancellor of Justice – Ülle Madise – 2015
 Minister of Entrepreneurship – Ülle Madise – 2015
 President – Kersti Kaljulaid – 2016
 Election-winning party leader – Kaja Kallas of the Estonian Reform Party – 2019
 Prime Minister – Kaja Kallas – 2021
 Minister of Social Protection – Signe Riisalo – 2021

Finland

Swedish Realm
 Regent – Ingeborg of Norway – 1319
 Monarch – Margaret I – 1389
 Governor of Turku – Ebba Stenbock (acting interim governor) – 1597

Grand Duchy
 Member of Parliament – Miina Sillanpää, Alli Nissinen, Hilma Räsänen, Ida Aalle-Teljo, Anni Huotari, Mimmi Kanervo, Hilja Pärssinen, Maria Raunio, Jenny Upari, Eveliina Ala-Kulju, Hedvig Gebhard, Liisi Kivioja, Iida Vemmelpuu – 1907

Republic
Minister of Social Affairs – Miina Sillanpää – 1926
Minister without portfolio – Hertta Kuusinen – 1948
 Deputy Prime Minister of Finland – Tyyne Leivo-Larsson – 1958
Education Minister – Kerttu Saalasti – 1954
Mayor of Loviisa – Birgitta Landgren – 1973
Minister of Justice – Inkeri Anttila – 1975 
Minister of Commerce and Industry – Pirkko Työläjärvi – 1981
Minister of Interior – Kaisa Raatikainen – 1984
 Defence minister – Elisabeth Rehn – 1990
Minister of Environmental Affairs – Sirpa Pietikäinen – 1991
Governor of Lapland – Hannele Pokka – 1994 
Speaker of the Parliament – Riitta Uosukainen – 1995
 Foreign minister – Tarja Halonen – 1995 
Minister of Transport – Tuula Linnainmaa – 1995
Mayor of Helsinki – Eva-Riitta Siitonen – 1996
Minister of Labour – Sinikka Mönkäre – 1999
Minister of Health and Social Services – Eva Biaudet – 1999
 Minister of Culture – Suvi Lindén – 1999
President – Tarja Halonen – 2000
Prime Minister – Anneli Jäätteenmäki – 2003
Minister of Agriculture – Sirkka-Liisa Anttila – 2007
Finance minister – Jutta Urpilainen – 2011
Mayor of Tampere – Anna-Kaisa Ikonen – 2013

Åland

 Lantråd (Premier) – Viveka Eriksson – 2007
Minister of Migration and European Affairs for Åland Islands – Astrid Thors – 2007-2011
 Member of Parliament in the Åland Islands – Elisabeth Nauclér – 2007

France

 Regent – Anne of Kiev – 1060
 Undersecretary of State for national education – Cécile Brunschvicg – 1936
 Undersecretary of state for Public Health – Suzanne Lacore – 1936
 Undersecretary of state for Science – Irène Joliot-Curie – 1936
 Minister of Health – Germaine Poinso-Chapuis – 1947 (first government minister; Simone Veil who held the portfolio between 1974 and 1979 is often incorrectly cited as the first officeholder)
 Prefect – Yvette Chassagne (Loir-et-Cher) – 1981
 Mayor of Strasbourg – Catherine Trautmann – 1989
 European Commissioner for Taxation and Customs Union, Audit and Anti-Fraud – Christiane Scrivener – 1989
 Prime Minister – Édith Cresson – 1991
 Minister of Labour – Martine Aubry – 1997
 Minister of Culture – Catherine Trautmann – 1997
 Minister of Justice – Élisabeth Guigou – 1997 
 Mayor of Lille – Martine Aubry – 2001
 Minister of Defence – Michèle Alliot-Marie – 2002 
 Mayor of Montpellier – Hélène Mandroux – 2004
 Minister of the Overseas – Brigitte Girardin – 2002
 Minister of the Interior – Michèle Alliot-Marie – 2007
 Minister of Finance – Christine Lagarde – 2007
 Minister of Foreign Affairs – Michèle Alliot-Marie – 2010
 Mayor of Nantes – Johanna Rolland– 2014
 Mayor of Paris – Anne Hidalgo– 2014
 Minister of Education – Najat Vallaud-Belkacem – 2014
 Mayor of Marseille – Michèle Rubirola– 2020
 President of the National Assembly of France - Yaël Braun-Pivet - 2022

Georgia

Kingdom
 Regent – Mariam of Vaspurakan – 1027
 Monarch – Tamar – 1178–1210

Georgian Soviet Socialist Republic 
 Minister of Trade – Zinaida Arsen'evna Kvachadze – 1957 
 Minister of Education – Tamar Lashkarashvili – 1960
 Deputy Premier – Victoria M. Siradze – 1962
 Vice-President – Tamar Lashkarashvili – 1979

Republic
 Speaker of the Georgian Parliament – Nino Burjanadze – 2003 – 2004 and 2007 
 President (acting) – Nino Burjanadze – 2003
 Minister for Foreign Affairs – Salomé Zurabishvili – 2004
 Minister of Economic Development – Ekaterine Sharashidze – 2008
 Minister of Defense – Tina Khidasheli – 1 May 2015

Abkhazia 
 Minister of Justice – Liudmila Khojashvili – 2005

Germany

Holy Roman Empire
 Regent – Adelaide of Italy and Theophanu (co-regents) – 983

Weimar Republic

 Weimar National Assembly – 36 women, among them being Marie Baum, Marie Juchacz, Louise Schroeder – 1919

Allied Occupation
 Mayor of Berlin – Louise Schroeder – 1947

Democratic Republic
 Member of the Presidium of the Volkskammer – Friedel Malter – 1948
 Minister of Justice – Hilde Benjamin – 1953 
 President of the Volkskammer and Acting Head of state – Sabine Bergmann-Pohl – 1990

Federal Republic (West)
 State secretary of Youth and Family Affairs – Gabriele Wülker – 1957
 Minister of Health – Elisabeth Schwarzhaupt – 1961
 President of the Bundestag – Annemarie Renger – 1972

Federal Republic (United)
 Minister of Justice – Sabine Leutheusser-Schnarrenberger – 1992 
 Minister-President of any German state – Heide Simonis (of Schleswig-Holstein) – 1993
 European Commissioner for Regional Policy – Monika Wulf-Mathies – 1994
 Mayor of Frankfurt – Petra Roth – 1995
 Chancellor – Angela Merkel – 2005
 Minister of Defence – Ursula von der Leyen – 2013
 Minister of Foreign Affairs – Annalena Baerbock – 2021

Greece

Kingdom
Regent – Amalia of Oldenburg – 1850
Member of Parliament – Eleni Skoura – 1953
 Mayor (Corfu)– Maria Desylla-Kapodistria – 1953
Government minister and Minister for Social Welfare – Lina Tsaldari – 1956

Republic
 Minister for Culture – Melina Mercouri – 1981
Minister of Justice – Anna Benaki-Psarouda – 1992
 Minister of Education and Religious Affairs – Marietta Giannakou-Koutsikou – 1993
 Minister for Environment – Vassiliki "Vaso" Papandreou – 1999
 European Commissioner for Employment and Social Affairs – Anna Diamantopoulou – 1999
 Mayor of Athens – Dora Bakoyannis – 2003
 President of Parliament – Anna Psarouda-Benaki – 2004 
 Minister for Foreign Affairs – Dora Bakoyannis – 2006
 Minister for Tourism – Fani Palli-Petralia – 2006
 Prime Minister (acting, not elected) – Vassiliki Thanou-Christophilou – 2015
President – Katerina Sakellaropoulou – 2020

Hungary

Kingdom
 Regent – Helena of Serbia, Queen of Hungary  – 1141
 Monarch – Mary of Hungary – 1382
 Member of Parliament – Margit Slachta – 1920

People's Republic
 Minister of Health – Anna Ratkó – 1950
 Minister of Light Industry - Józefné Nagy/ Nagy Jolán Szanka - 1955
 Minister of Education – Valéria Benke – 1958
 Speaker of the National Assembly – Erzsébet Metzker Vass – 1963
 Deputy Premier Minister - Csehák Judit - 1984
 Minister of Social Affairs and Health - Csehák Judit - 1987

Republic
 Minister for Justice – Ibolya Dávid – 1998 
 Minister for Interior – Mónika Lamperth – 2002
 Minister for Equality – Katalin Lévai – 2004
 Foreign Minister – Kinga Göncz – 2006
 Health Minister – Ágnes Horváth – 2007
 Minister of National Development – Zsuzsanna Németh – 2011
 President – Katalin Novák – 2022

Iceland

Kingdom
 Member of a City Council – Bríet Bjarnhéðinsdóttir – 1908
 Member of Parliament – Ingibjörg H. Bjarnason – 1922

Republic
 Mayor of Reykjavík – Auður Auðuns – 1960
 Speaker of Parliament (lower house) – Ragnhildur Helgadóttir – 1961
 Minister of Justice and Ecclesiastical Affairs – Auður Auðuns – 1970
 President – Vigdís Finnbogadóttir – 1980
 Speaker of Parliament (upper house) – Salome Þorkelsdóttir – 1983
 Minister of Education, Science and Culture – Ragnhildur Helgadóttir – 1983
 Minister of Health and Social Security – Ragnhildur Helgadóttir – 1985
 Speaker of Parliament (bicameral united house) – Salome Þorkelsdóttir – 1991
 Speaker of Parliament (unicameral) – Salome Þorkelsdóttir – 1991
 Minister for the Environment – Siv Friðleifsdóttir – 1999
 Minister of Industry – Valgerður Sverrisdóttir – 1999
 Minister for Foreign Affairs – Valgerður Sverrisdóttir – 2006
 Prime Minister – Jóhanna Sigurðardóttir – 2009
 Minister of Finance – Oddný Guðbjörg Harðardóttir – 2011

Ireland

Kingdom of Ireland
Queen regnant – Mary I – 1553

United Kingdom of Great Britain and Ireland
 Member of parliament – Constance Markievicz – 1918

Irish Republic
 Teachta Dála – Constance Markievicz – 1919
 Minister for Labour – Constance Markievicz – 1919

Free State
 Senator (Free State Senate) – Eileen Costello, Alice Stopford Green, Ellen Cuffe and Jennie Wyse Power – 1922
 Leader of a political party – Margaret Buckley – 1937

Ireland (Republic of Ireland)

 Senator (Senate of the Republic) – Margaret Mary Pearse, Linda Kearns MacWhinney, Helena Concannon and Margaret L. Kennedy – 1938
 Lord Mayor of Dublin – Kathleen Clarke – 1939
 Lord Mayor of Cork – Jane Dowdall – 1959
 Department of State Secretary-General – Thekla Beere – 1959
 Mayor of Limerick – Frances Condell – 1963
 Council of State Member – Honor Crowley – 1964
 Minister of State – Máire Geoghegan-Quinn – 1977
 Member of the European Parliament – Eileen Desmond and Síle de Valera – 1979
 Minister for the Gaeltacht – Máire Geoghegan-Quinn – 1979
 Leader of the Seanad – Gemma Hussey – 1981
 Minister for Health and Social Welfare – Eileen Desmond – 1981
 Minister for Education – Gemma Hussey – 1982
Cathaoirleach of Seanad Éireann – Tras Honan – 1982
 President – Mary Robinson – 1990 
 Minister for Tourism, Transport and Communications – Máire Geoghegan-Quinn – 1992
 Leader of a political party in Dáil Éireann – Mary Harney – 1993
 Minister for Justice – Máire Geoghegan-Quinn – 1993
 Tánaiste (Deputy Prime Minister) – Mary Harney – 1997
 Minister for Enterprise, Trade and Employment – Mary Harney – 1997
 Minister for Arts, Heritage, Gaeltacht and the Islands – Síle de Valera – 1997
 Minister for Agriculture and Food – Mary Coughlan – 2004
 Government Chief Whip – Mary Hanafin – 2002
 European Commissioner for Research, Innovation and Science – Máire Geoghegan-Quinn – 2009
 Attorney General – Máire Whelan – 2011
 Minister for Children and Youth Affairs – Frances Fitzgerald – 2011
Leader of the Opposition – Mary Lou McDonald – 2020
Leas-Cheann Comhairle – Catherine Connolly – 2020
Minister for Rural and Community Development – Heather Humphreys – 2020
European Commissioner for Financial Stability, Financial Services and the Capital Markets Union – Mairead McGuinness – 2020

Italy

 Undersecretary of Industry and Trade – Angela Maria Guidi Cingolani – 1951
 Minister of Labour and Social Security – Tina Anselmi – 1976
 Minister for Health – Tina Anselmi – 1978 (First female governmental minister) 
 President of the Chamber of Deputies – Nilde Iotti – 1979
 Minister of Education – Franca Falcucci – 1982
 Senator for Life – Camilla Ravera – 1982
 Minister of Tourism – Margherita Boniver – 1992
 President of Lombardia – Fiorella Ghilardotti – 1992
 Minister for Agriculture and Forests – Adriana Poli Bortone – 1994
 European Commissioner for Health and Consumer Protection – Emma Bonino – 1995
 Minister of Foreign Affairs – Susanna Agnelli – 1995
 Minister without Portfolio – Livia Turco – 1996
 Minister for Equal Opportunities – Anna Finocchiaro – 1996
 Minister of Cultural Activities and Sport – Giovanna Melandri – 1998
 Minister of Interior – Rosa Russo Iervolino – 1998 
 President of Trentino-Alto Adige – Margherita Cogo – 1999 
 President of Umbria – Maria Rita Lorenzetti – 2000
 Mayor of Naples – Rosa Russo Iervolino – 2001
 President of Piedmont – Mercedes Bresso – 2006
 Minister of European Politics and International Trade – Emma Bonino – 2006 
 Mayor of Milan – Letizia Moratti – 2006
 Minister of the Environment – Stefania Prestigiacomo – 2008
 President of Democratic Party (Italy) – Rosy Bindi – 2009 
 President of Lazio – Renata Polverini – 2010
 Minister of Justice – Paola Severino – 2011 
 President of Friuli-Venezia Giulia – Debora Serracchiani – 2013
 Minister of Integration – Cécile Kyenge – 2013
 Minister of Defence – Roberta Pinotti – 2014
 Minister of Economic Development – Federica Guidi – 2014
 Minister of Constitutional Reforms and Parliamentary Relations – Maria Elena Boschi – 2014
Mayor of Rome – Virginia Raggi – 2016
President of the Senate – Maria Elisabetta Alberti Casellati – 2018
 Prime Minister – Giorgia Meloni – 2022

Latvia

First Republic
 Member of Parliament – Berta Pīpiņa – 1931
 Deputy Minister of Education – Valērija Seile – 1921

Latvian Soviet Socialist Republic
 Government Minister (People's Comissar of State Control) – Olga Martynovna Auguste – 1941
Minister of Justice – Emīlija Veinberga – 1951 
Chairman of the Supreme Soviet – Valentina S. Klibike – 1975

Second Republic
 President – Vaira Vīķe-Freiberga – 1999
 Member of the Saeima – Berta Pipina – 1931
 Speaker of the Saeima – Ilga Kreituse – 1995
 Foreign Minister – Sandra Kalniete – 2002
 European Commissioner for Agriculture and Fisheries – Sandra Kalniete – 2004
 Defence Minister – Linda Mūrniece – 2006
 Prime Minister – Laimdota Straujuma – 2014

Liechtenstein

 Deputy Government Councillor for Social Affairs – Maria Foser – 1984
 Minister of Transport and Building – Cornelia Gassner – 1993 
Minister of Foreign Affairs – Andrea Willi – 1993

Lithuania

Republic
 Members of Parliament – Felicija Bortkevičienė and Gabrielė Petkevičaitė-Bitė – 1920
 Speaker of the constituent session of the Constituent Assembly of Lithuania – Gabrielė Petkevičaitė-Bitė – 15 May 1920

Lithuanian Soviet Socialist Republic

 Vice-President – Leokadija Diržinskaitė-Piliušenko – 1959
 Minister of Foreign Affairs – Leokadija Diržinskaitė-Piliušenko – 1961 
 Head of the Central Committee Department of Trade and Public Service – Jaina B. Tatsiavichenė – 1971 
 Prime Minister – Kazimira Prunskienė – 1990

Republic of Lithuania
 European Commissioner for Financial Programming and the Budget – Dalia Grybauskaitė – 2004
 President – Dalia Grybauskaitė – 2009
 Foreign minister (acting) – Rasa Juknevičienė – 2010

Luxembourg

County, Duchy and Grand Duchy
 Monarch – Ermesinde, Countess of Luxembourg – 1197

Grand Duchy
 Grand Duchess – Marie-Adélaïde – 1912
 Member of Parliament – Marguerite Thomas-Clement – 1919
 Minister of Family, Youth, Social Solidarity, Health, Culture and Religious Affairs – Madeleine Frieden-Kinnen – 1969
Mayor of Luxembourg City – Colette Flesch– 1970
Deputy Prime Minister – Colette Flesch – 1980
President of the Council of the European Union – Colette Flesch – 1980 
Minister of Justice – Colette Flesch – 1980
 Minister for Foreign Affairs – Colette Flesch – 1980
President of the Chamber of Deputies – Erna Hennicot-Schoepges – 1989
European Commissioner for Justice, Consumers and Gender Equality – Martine Reicherts – 2009

Macedonia

 Minister of Development – Sofija Todorova – 1992
 Minister without portfolio – Gordana Siljanovska – 1992
 Interior minister – Dosta Dimovska – 1999
 Foreign minister – Ilinka Mitreva – 2001
Minister of JusticeМинистер за правда на Македонија — Википедија – Meri Mladenovska Gjorgjievska – 2002
 Prime Minister (acting) – Radmila Šekerinska – 2004
 President of Social Democratic Union of Macedonia – Radmila Šekerinska – 2006
 Minister of Culture – Elizabeta Kanceska Milevska – 2008

Malta

Colony
 Member of Parliament – Agatha Barbara – 1947
 Minister – Agatha Barbara – 1955

Republic
 President – Agatha Barbara – 1982
 Mayor (Għasri, Gozo) – Rita Cutajar – 1993
 Speaker of the House of Representatives – Myriam Spiteri Debono – 1996

Moldova

 Minister of Education – Agrippina Nikitichna Krachun – 1959
Minister of Justice – Valeria Șterbeț – 1999 
Speaker of the Parliament – Eugenia Ostapciuc – 2001
 Prime Minister – Zinaida Greceanîi – 2008
 Finance minister – Marianna Durlesteanu – 2008
 Foreign minister – Natalia Gherman – 2013
 President – Maia Sandu – 2021

Transnistria
unrecognized, secessionist state

 Foreign minister – Nina Shtanski – 2012
 Prime Minister – Tatiana Turanskaya – 2013

Monaco
 Communal Council – Roxane Noat-Notari – 1955
 National Council – Roxane Noat-Notari – 1963
 Mayor of Monaco – Anne-Marie Campora – 1991
 Government Councillor of Finance and Economy – Sophie Thevenoux – 2009
 Government Councillor of Department of Infrastructure, Environment and Urbanization – Marie-Pierre Gramaglia – 2011

Montenegro

Serbia and Montenegro
 Speaker of Parliament – Vesna Perović – 2001
 Supreme State Attorney – Vesna Medenica – 2004
 Mayor of City/President of Municipality (first elected) – Marija-Maja Ćatović – 2005

Republic of Montenegro
 Deputy Prime Minister – Gordana Đurović – 2006

Netherlands

Spanish Netherlands
Governor – Margaret of Austria- 1507–1530

Dutch Republic
 Diplomat – Bartholda van Swieten – 1615
 Regent (acting stadtholder) – Anne, Princess Royal and Princess of Orange – 1751

Kingdom 
 Monarch – Queen Wilhelmina – 1890
 Member of the House of Representatives of the States-General – Suze Groeneweg – 1917
 Member of the Senate of the States-General – Carry Pothuis-Smit – 1920
 Alderman – Eiske ten Bos-Harkema – 1924
 Mayor – Truus Smulders-Beliën – 1946
 Minister of Social Work – Marga Klompé – 1956
 Minister of Education, Arts and Sciences – Marga Klompé – 1961
 Party chair – Haya van Someren – 1969
 Minister of Health and Hygiene – Irene Vorrink – 1973
 Parliamentary leader in the Senate – Haya van Someren – 1976
 Party leader – Ria Beckers – 1977
 Parliamentary leader in the House of Representatives – Ria Beckers – 1977
 Minister of Transport, Public Works and Water Management – Neelie Kroes – 1982
 Minister for Development Cooperation – Eegje Schoo – 1982
 Minister of the Interior – Ien Dales – 1989
 Minister of Justice – Winnie Sorgdrager – 1994 
 Minister of Housing, Spatial Planning and the Environment – Margreeth de Boer – 1994
 Deputy Prime Ministers – Annemarie Jorritsma and Els Borst – 1998
 Minister of Economic Affairs – Annemarie Jorritsma – 1998
 Speaker of the House of Representatives – Jeltje van Nieuwenhoven – 1998
 Minister of Education, Culture and Science – Maria van der Hoeven – 2002
 Minister for Integration and Immigration – Rita Verdonk – 2003
 President of the Senate – Yvonne Timmerman-Buck – 2003
 European Commissioner – Neelie Kroes – 2004
 Minister of Agriculture, Nature and Food Quality – Gerda Verburg – 2007
 Minister of Infrastructure and the Environment – Melanie Schultz van Haegen – 2010
 Minister of Defence – Jeanine Hennis-Plasschaert – 2012
 Minister of Foreign Affairs – Sigrid Kaag – 2018
 Minister of Social Affairs – Karien van Gennip – 2022
 Minister of Finance – Sigrid Kaag – 2022

Norway

 Monarch – Margaret I – 1387
 Deputy member of the Norwegian Parliament – Anna Rogstad – 1911
 Member of the Norwegian Parliament – Karen Platou – 1921
 Mayor – Aasa Helgesen (in Utsira) – 1926
 Minister of Social Affairs – Kirsten Hansteen – 1945
Minister of Justice – Elisabeth Schweigaard Selmer – 1965
 State Secretary – Elsa Rastad Bråten – 1971
 President of the Lagting – Torild Skard – 1973
 Minister of the Environment – Gro Harlem Brundtland – 1974
 County Governor – Ebba Lodden (in Aust-Agder) – 1974
 Prime Minister – Gro Harlem Brundtland – 1981
Chief of Police (Halden) – Ann-Kristin Olsen
 President of the Odelsting – Åshild Hauan – 1985
 Mayor of Oslo – Ann-Marit Sæbønes – 1992
 President of the Storting – Kirsti Kolle Grøndahl – 1993
Minister of Defence – Eldbjørg Løwer – 2001
 Minister of Finance – Kristin Halvorsen – 2005
 Minister of Foreign Affairs – Ine Marie Eriksen Søreide – 2017

Other political positions
 Party leader – Eva Kolstad (Liberal) – 1974

Svalbard 
Governor of Svalbard – Ann-Kristin Olsen – 1995

Poland

Kingdom (1385–1569)
 Monarch – Jadwiga of Poland – 1384

Second Republic
 First members of Sejm (lower house of the parliament) – Gabriela Balicka, Jadwiga Dziubińska, Irena Kosmowska, Maria Moczydłowska, Zofia Moraczewska, Anna Piasecka, Zofia Sokolnicka, Franciszka Wilczkowiakowa – 1919
 Senator – Zofia Daszyńska-Golińska – 1928

People's Republic
 Vice-Chairperson of the Provisoric Government – Wanda Wasilewska – 1944
 Minister of Justice – Zofia Wasilkowska – 1956 
 Minister of Administration, Land Economy and Environment – Maria Milczarek – 1976
 Minister of Labor, Welfare and Social Policy – Maria Milczarek – 1979
 Minister of Education and Behaviour – Joanna Michałowska-Gumowska – 1985
 Minister of Health and Welfare – Izabela Płaneta-Małecka – 1988

Republic
 Minister of Culture and Art – Izabella Cywińska – 1989
 Minister of Industry and Commerce – Henryka Bochniarz – 1991
 Prime Minister – Hanna Suchocka – 1992 
 Chairman of the National Bank of Poland – Hanna Gronkiewicz-Waltz – 1992
 Minister of Construction and Spatial Management – Barbara Blida – 1993
 Marshal of the Senate – Alicja Grześkowiak – 1997
 Minister of Finance – Halina Wasilewska-Trenkner – 2001
 Minister of State Treasury – Aldona Kamela-Sowińska – 2001
 Minister of European Affairs – Danuta Hübner – 2003
 Deputy Prime Minister – Izabela Jaruga-Nowacka – 2004 
 Minister of Social Policy – Izabela Jaruga-Nowacka – 2004
 European Commissioner for Regional Policy – Danuta Hübner – 2004
 Minister of Regional Development – Grażyna Gęsicka – 2005
 Minister of Foreign Affairs – Anna Fotyga – 2006
 President of Warsaw – Hanna Gronkiewicz-Waltz – 2006
 Minister of Sport and Tourism – Elżbieta Jakubiak – 2007
 Minister of Science and Higher Education – Barbara Kudrycka – 2007
 Marshal of the Sejm – Ewa Kopacz – 2011

Portugal

County
 Countess – Theresa, Countess of Portugal – 1112

Kingdom
 Monarch (disputed) – Beatrice of Portugal – 1383
 Monarch – Maria I – 1777

Republic
 Undersecretary of the Ministry of Health and Assistance – Maria Teresa Cárcomo Lobo – 1970
Minister of Social Affairs – Maria de Lurdes Pintasilgo – 1974
 Prime Minister – Maria de Lurdes Pintasilgo – 1979
 Minister of Health – Leonor Beleza – 1985
 Judge of the Constitutional Court – Maria da Assunção Esteves – 1989
 Minister of Education – Manuela Ferreira Leite – 1993
 Minister of Environment – Teresa Patrício de Gouveia – 1993
 Minister for Qualification and Employment – Maria João Rodrigues – 1995
 Minister of Planning – Elisa Ferreira – 1999
 Minister of State and Minister of Finance – Manuela Ferreira Leite – 2002
 Minister of Justice – Celeste Cardona – 2002 
 Minister of Science and Higher Education – Graça Carvalho – 2003
 Minister of Foreign Affairs – Teresa Patrício de Gouveia – 2003
 Minister of Culture – Maria João Bustorff – 2004
 Minister of Environment and Territorial Organization – Dulce Pássaro – 2009
 Leader of the Opposition – Manuela Ferreira Leite – 2008
 President of the Assembly of the Republic – Maria da Assunção Esteves – 2011
 Minister of Agriculture, Sea, Environment and Territorial Organization – Maria de Assunção Oliveira Cristas Machado da Graças – 2011
 Vice-President of the Constitutional Court – Maria Lúcia Amaral – 2012
 Attorney General of the Republic – Joana Marques Vidal – 2012
 President of the Legislative Assembly of the Azores – Ana Luís – 2012
 Minister of Internal Administration – Anabela Rodrigues – 2014
 Minister of the Presidency and Administrative Modernization – Maria Manuel Leitão Marques – 2015
 Ombudswoman – Maria Lúcia Amaral – 2017

Romania

Kingdom
 Mayor (of Bogdănești, Vaslui) – Luiza Zavloschi – 1930

People's Republic

 Minister of Health – Florica Bagdasar – 1946
 Minister of Foreign Affairs – Ana Pauker – 1947
 Minister of Social Affairs – Stella Ernestu – 1952
 Minister of Culture and Art – Constanța Crăciun – 1953
 Vice-President of the State Council – Constanța Crăciun – 1966
 Minister of Industry – Ana Mureson – 1966
 Member of the Politburo –  Lina Ciobanu – 1977
 Minister of Education – Aneta Spornic – 1979
 First Deputy Prime Minister – Elena Ceauşescu – 1980
 Vice-President of the Council of State  – Maria Ciocan – 1980
 Minister of the Food Industry – Paula Prioteasa – 1986
 Minister of Labour – Alexandrina Gainusa – 1986
 Minister of Justice – Maria Bobu – 1987

Republic
 Member of the Council of the National Salvation Front and Joint Collective Head of State – Christina Cioutu – 1989
 Prefect (of Bucharest) – Mioara Mantale – 2004
 President of the Chamber of Deputies – Roberta Anastase – 2008
 Minister of Tourism – Elena Udrea – 2008
 European Commissioner for Regional Policy – Corina Crețu – 2014
 Prime Minister – Viorica Dăncilă – 2018
President of the Senate – Anca Dragu – 2020

Russia

Imperial
 Regent – Elena Glinskaya – 1533
 Monarch – Catherine I of Russia – 1725

Intermin Republic
 Vice Minister of State Welfare and Vice Minister of Education – Sofia Panina – 1917

Union of Soviet Socialist Republics

 Commissar (Minister) – Alexandra Kollontai – 1917 (First female minister in the world)
 Commissioner of Foreign Affairs – Angelika Balabanoff – 1918 
 People's Commissar of the Navy – Larisa Mikhailovna Reisner – 1918 
 Candidate Member of the Politburo – Elena Stasova – 1919
 Member of the Central Committee of the Communist Party of the Soviet Union – Nadezhda Krupskaya – 1924
 Deputy minister (Commissar) of Education – Nadezhda Krupskaya – 1929
 People's Commissar of Finance – Vavara Nikoleavna Iakovleva – 1929
 Member of the Supreme Soviet – Nadezhda Krupskaya – 1931
 Member of Presidium of the Supreme Soviet – Nadezhda Krupskaya and Klavdiya Nikolayeva – 1937
 First Secretary of the Communist Party – Domina Komarova – 1948 
 Minister of Health – Maria Kovrigina – 1953
 Full Member of the Politburo – Ekaterina Furtseva – 1957
 Minister of Culture – Ekaterina Furtseva – 1960
 Deputy Minister of Light Industry – Eudokiia F. Karpova – 1964
 Deputy Premier Minister and Head of the Central Committee Department of Light and Local Industry – Eudokiia F. Karpova – 1966
 Vice-chairman of the Council of ministres of the RSFSR – Lidia Lykova – 1967
 Vice-Chairperson of the Supreme Soviet – Tatyana G. Ivanova – 1985

Federation
 Member of the Consultative Council of the President – Tatyana Zaslavskaya – 1992
 Governor – Valentina Matviyenko – 2003
 Mayor of Saint Petersburg – Valentina Matviyenko – 2003
 Chairwoman of the Federation Council of Russia – Valentina Matviyenko – 2011

San Marino

 Minister of the Interior and of Justice – Clara Boscaglia – 1978 
Co-Captain Regent – Maria Lea Pedini-Angelini – 1981
 Foreign minister – Antonella Mularoni – 2008

Serbia

Imperial 
 Regent – Helena of Bulgaria – 1355–1357

Despotate
 Monarch – Jelena (Marija) – 1458 – 1459

Principality
 Education and Art adviser – Katarina Ivanović – 1870
 Member of the Great People's Assembly of Serbs, Bunjevci and other Slavs in Banat, Bačka and Baranja – Milica Tomić, Mara Đorđević Malagurski, Anastasija Manojlović, Marija Jovanović, Olga Stanković, Katica Rajčić and Manda Sudarević – 1918.

Socialist Yugoslavian Republic
 Minister of Education – Mitra Mitrović – 1945–1948
 Minister of Labour – Spasenija Cana Babović – 1946–1948
 Minister of Health – Spasenija Cana Babović – 1948–1953
 Deputy Prime Minister – Spasenija Cana Babović – 1953–1963

Federal Yugoslavia
President of the Federal Chamber – Stana Tomasević-Arnesen – 1979
President of the Federal Executive Council (Prime Minister) – Milka Planinc – 1982
Mayor of Belgrade – Slobodanka Gruden – 1993–1994
 Minister of Social affairs, family and equality – Margit Savović – 1994–1996
 Leader of Party Yugoslav (Left) – Mirjana Marković – 1994–2001
 Deputy Prime Minister – Maja Gojković – 1998–2000
 Minister of Self-government – Gordana Pop Lazić – 1998–2000
 Minister of Information – Radmila Milentijević – 1998–2000
 Minister of Economic transformation – Jorgovanka Tabaković – 1998–2000
 Minister of Labour and Employment – Gordana Matković – 2001–2004
 President of Party of successful women – Margit Savović – 2001–2004
 Minister of Environment – Anđelka Mihajlov – 2001-2002
 President of the Supreme Court – Leposava Karamarković – 2001–2002
 Minister of Traffic and Telecommunication – Marija Rašeta Vukosavljević – 2001–2004
 Speaker of the National Assembly of Serbia – Nataša Mićić – 2001– 2004
 President (acting) – Nataša Mićić – 2002–2003
 Minister of Energy and Mining – Kori Udovički – 2001–2003
 Governor of a National Bank of Serbia – Kori Udovički – 2003–2004
 Minister of Education – Ljiljana Čolić – 2004
 Mayor of Novi Sad – Maja Gojković – 2004–2008

Republic of Serbia
 Deputy Prime Minister – Ivana Dulić-Marković – 2006
 Minister of Science – Ana Pešikan – 2007–2008
 Minister of Telecommunication and Informatics – Aleksandra Smiljanić – 2007–2008
 President of the Constitutional Court of Serbia – Bosa Nenadić – 2007–2010
 Deputy Prime Minister and Minister of Economy – Verica Kalanović – 2011–2012
 Minister of Finance – Diana Dragutinović – 2008–2011
 Minister of Justice – Snežana Malović – 2008–2012
 Mayor of Pančevo – Vesna Martinović – 2008–2012
 President of the Supreme Court of Cassation – Nata Mesarović – 2010–2013
 State Attorney – Zagorka Dolovac – 2012
 President (acting) – Slavica Đukić Dejanović – 2012
 President of Christian Democratic Party of Serbia – Olgica Batić – 2011 
 President of party Together for Vojvodina – Olena Papuga – 2012 
 Minister of Energy – Zorana Mihajlović – 2012–2014
 Deputy Prime Minister – Suzana Grubješić – 2012–2013
 Mayor of Smederevo – Jasna Avramović – 2012
 Governor of a National Bank of Serbia – Jorgovanka Tabaković – 2012
 Speaker of the National Assembly of Serbia – Maja Gojković – 2014
 Deputy Prime Minister and a Minister of Transportation, Construction and Infrastructure – Zorana Mihajlović – 2014
 Deputy Prime Minister and a Minister of State and Local Governments – Kori Udovički – 2014 
 Minister of Agriculture and Environment – Snežana Bogosavljević Bošković – 2014 
 Minister of European Integration – Jadranka Joksimović – 2014
 President of Democratic Party of Serbia – Sanda Rašković Ivić – 2014
 Mayor of Vršac – Dragana Mitrović – 2016
 Mayor of Sombor – Dušanka Golubović – 2016 
 Prime Minister – Ana Brnabić – 2017
 Mayor of Kruševac – Jasmina Palurović – 2017
 Mayor of Niš – Dragana Sotirovski – 2020
 Mayor of Užice – Jelena Raković Radivojević – 2020
 Mayor of Sremska Mitrovica – Svetlana Milovanović – 2020

Kosovo
partially recognized secessionist state under nominal international administration
 Foreign minister (acting) – Vlora Çitaku – 2010
 President – Atifete Jahjaga – 2011

Slovakia

 Minister of Labour, Social Affairs and Family – Oľga Keltošová – 1993 (also Minister of Labour, Social Affairs and Family of Slovakia within Czechoslovakia since 1992)
 Minister of Justice – Katarína Tóthová – 1993 (also Minister of Justice of Slovakia within Czechoslovakia since 1992)
 Minister of Health – Irena Belohorská – 1993
 Deputy Prime Minister – Brigita Schmögnerová – 1994
 Minister of Education – Eva Slavkovská – 1994
 Minister of Foreign Affairs – Zdenka Kramplová – 1997
 Minister of Privatization – Mária Machová – 1998
 Minister of Finance – Brigita Schmögnerová – 1998
 Deputy Speaker of the National Council of the Slovak Republic – Zuzana Martináková – 2002
 Minister of Agriculture – Zdenka Kramplová – 2007
 Chief Justice of the Constitutional Court of Slovakia – Ivetta Macejková – 2007
 Prime Minister – Iveta Radičová – 2010
President – Zuzana Čaputová – 2019

Please note: Independent Slovak Republic was established on January 1, 1993. The first female politicians of Slovak Republic as a part of Czech and Slovak Federative Republic are not included above.

List of Slovak female holders of political offices before independence

Czechoslovakia
Member of Parliament – Irena Kaňová – 1919
Commissioner for Health and Social Welfare (equivalent to minister) – Emília Janečková-Muríňová – 1950
Minister of Health and Social Affairs – Eva Tökölyová – 1986
Minister of State Audit – Mária Kolaříková – 1989

Czech and Slovak Federative Republic
Minister of Labour, Social Affairs and Family – Helena Woleková – 1991
Minister of Trade and Tourism – Jana Kotová – 1992
Minister of Justice – Katarína Tóthová – 1992
Minister of Labour, Social Affairs and Family – Oľga Keltošová – 1992

Slovenia
 Ministry of Health – Katja Boh – 1990
 Minister of Labour, Family, Social Affairs and Equal Opportunities – Jožica Puhar – 1990
 Minister of Veterans and War Invalides – Ana Osterman – 1990
 Ministry of Justice – Metka Zupančič – 1994
 Ministry of Economy Development and Technologies – Tea Petrin – 2000
 Ministry of Culture – Andreja Rihter – 2000
 Ministry of Education, Science and Sport – Lucija Čok – 2000
 Ministry without Portfolio (Regional Development) – Zdenka Kovač – 2002
 Ministry of Agriculture and Forestry – Zdenka Kovač – 2004
 Minister of the Interior – Katarina Kresal – 2008
 Ministry of Public Administration – Irma Pavlinič Krebs – 2008
 Minister of Defence – Ljubica Jelušič – 2008
 Prime Minister – Alenka Bratušek – 2013
 Ministry of Environment and Spatial Planning – Irena Majcen – 2014
 European Commissioner for Transport – Violeta Bulc – 2014
 President – Nataša Pirc Musar – 2022

Spain

Kingdom
This list includes office holders after the unification of Spain in the 16th-century:
 Monarch – Joanna I – 1504–1555
 Regent – Isabella of Portugal – 1535–1539
 First Female Mayor – Matilde Pérez Mollá – 1924
 First thirteen Members of National Assembly – Blanca de los Ríos de Lampérez, Isidra Quesada y Gutiérrez de los Ríos, Micaela Díaz y Rabaneda, María de Maeztu, María de Echarri y Martínez, María López de Sagredo, Concepción Loring y Heredia, Carmen Cuesta del Muro, Teresa Luzzatti Quiñones, Josefina Oloriz Arcelus, María López Moleón, María Natividad Domínguez de Roger y Trinidad Von Scholtzhermensdorff – 1927

Second Republic
 Members of Parliament – Margarita Nelken, Clara Campoamor and Victoria Kent – 1931
 First democratic mayor – María Domínguez Remón – 1932
 Minister of Health – Federica Montseny – 1936

Francoist Spain
 Mayor of Bilbao – Pilar Careaga – 1969

Kingdom (restored) 
 Mayor of Vigo – Enma González – 1978
 Minister of Culture – Soledad Becerril – 1981
 Mayor of Valencia – Clementina Ródenas – 1988
 President of the Region of Murcia – María Antonia Martínez – 1993
 Mayor of Seville – Soledad Becerril – 1995
 Mayor of Saragossa – Luisa Fernanda Rudi – 1995
 Mayor of Málaga – Celia Villalobos – 1995
 Minister of Environment – Isabel Tocino – 1996
 Minister of Agriculture – Loyola de Palacio – 1996 
 Minister of Justice – Margarita Mariscal de Gante – 1996 
 President of Senate – Esperanza Aguirre – 1999
 Minister of Education – Esperanza Aguirre – 1999
 Mayor of Cordóba – Rosa Aguilar – 1999
 Mayor of Gijón – Paz Fernández – 1999
 European Commissioner for Transport and Energy – Loyola de Palacio – 1999
 Minister of Industry – Anna Birulés – 2000
 Foreign minister – Ana Palacio – 2002
 Minister of Public Administrations – Julia García-Valdecasas – 2003
 President of the Community of Madrid – Esperanza Aguirre – 2003
 Mayor of Las Palmas – Josefa Luzardo – 2003
 Mayoress of Palma de Mallorca – Catalina Cirer – 2003
 Minister of Public Works – Magdalena Álvarez – 2004
 Minister of Presidency – María Teresa Fernández de la Vega – 2004
 Minister of Housing – María Antonia Trujillo – 2004
 First Vice President of the Government – María Teresa Fernández de la Vega – 2004
 Minister of Defense – Carme Chacón – 2008
 Minister of Science and Innovation – Cristina Garmendia – 2008
 Minister of Equality – Bibiana Aído – 2008
 Mayor of Alicante – Sonia Castedo – 2008
 Minister of Economy – Elena Salgado – 2009
 Mayor of Madrid – Ana Botella – 2011
 Mayor of Barcelona – Ada Colau – 2015
President of the Parliament of Catalonia – Nuria de Gispert – 2010

Autonomous City 
 Senator and Deputy (Melilla) – María del Carmen Dueñas

Sweden

Kingdom
During the Kalmar Union (1397–1523), Sweden-Finland was in union with Denmark and Norway, but maintained its own administration. Sweden was in union with Norway during the United Kingdoms of Sweden and Norway (1814–1905), but each country had its own administration and laws, and thus should be listed separately. 
 Regent: Ingeborg of Norway – 1319
 Monarch – Margaret I – 1389
 Governor (häradshövding) of Stranda Hundred – Sigrid Sture – 1577
 Member of a government committee – Sophie Adlersparre and Hilda Caselli – 1885
 Member of a Public Comity (Public School Board): Lilly Engström – 1889
 Member of the Executive Committee of a Political party – Kata Dalström – 1900
 Chairperson of the Women's trades union – Anna Sterky – 1902
 Member of the City Council of Stockholm – Gertrud Månsson – 1910
 Member of a City Council – 37 women, among them Hanna Lindberg – 1910
 Member of the legislative assembly – Emilia Broomé – 1914
 Member of the Riksdag (lower house) – Elisabeth Tamm, Agda Östlund, Nelly Thüring and Bertha Wellin – 1921
 Member of the Riksdag (upper house) – Kerstin Hesselgren – 1921
 Minister without portfolio – Karin Kock-Lindberg – 1947
 Minister for Public Housekeeping – Karin Kock-Lindberg – 1948
 Minister of Family, Consumption, Aid and Immigration – Ulla Lindström – 1954
 Acting prime minister – Ulla Lindström – 1958
 Permanent Representative of Sweden to the United Nations – Agda Rössel – 1958
 Chairperson of City Council – Blenda Ljungberg – 1959
 Municipal commissioner – Ella Tengbom-Velander – 1967
 Supreme Court Justice – Ingrid Gärde Widemar – 1968
 County Governor – Camilla Odhnoff – 1974
 Minister for Foreign Affairs – Karin Söder – 1976
 Minister for Health and Social Affairs – Karin Söder – 1979
 Minister for Education – Lena Hjelm-Wallén – 1982
 Minister for Employment – Anna-Greta Leijon – 1982
 Leader of a political party represented in the Riksdag – Karin Söder – 1985
 Minister for Justice – Anna-Greta Leijon – 1987
 Minister for the Environment – Birgitta Dahl – 1987
 Speaker of the Riksdag – Ingegerd Troedsson – 1991
 Minister for Finance – Anne Wibble – 1991
 Minister for Culture – Birgit Friggebo – 1991
 Deputy Prime Minister – Mona Sahlin – 1994
 Minister for Agriculture – Margareta Winberg – 1994
 European Commissioner for Immigration, Justice, Home Affairs and Financial Control – Anita Gradin – 1995
 Minister for Defence – Leni Björklund – 2002
 Mayor of Stockholm – Annika Billström – 2002
 Prime Minister – Magdalena Andersson – 2021

Switzerland

 Member of a citizens' council – Trudy Späth-Schweizer – 1958
 President of a Cantonal Parliament (of Geneva) – Emma Kammacher – 1965
 Mayor (of Geneva) – Lise Girardin – 1968
 Member of the Swiss Council of States – Lise Girardin – 1971
 Member of the Swiss National Council – Nelly Wicky, Lilian Uchtenhagen, Hanny Thalmann, Liselotte Spreng, Hanna Sahlfeld, Martha Ribi, Gabrielle Nanchen, Josi Meier, Hedi Lang, Tilo Frey, Elisabeth Blunschy – 1971
 President of the Swiss National Council – Elisabeth Blunschy – 1977
 Member of a Cantonal Executive (of Zurich) – Hedi Lang – 1983
 Member of the Swiss Federal Council – Elisabeth Kopp – 1984
 Justice minister – Elisabeth Kopp – 1984
 Vice-President of the Swiss Confederation – Elisabeth Kopp – 1989
 President of the Swiss Council of States – Josi Meier – 1991
 Landammann of Schwyz – Margrit Weber-Röllin – 1992
 Schultheiss of Lucerne – Brigitte Mürner-Gilli – 1992
 Landammann of Zug – Ruth Schwerzmann – 1993
 Landammann of Aargau – Stéphanie Mörikofer – 1997
 President of the Swiss Confederation – Ruth Dreifuss – 1999
 Landammann of Uri – Gabi Huber – 2002
 Foreign minister – Micheline Calmy-Rey – 2003
 Landammann of Nidwalden – Lisbeth Gabriel – 2005
 Economics minister – Doris Leuthard – 2006
 Landammann of Glarus – Marianne Dürst – 2008
 Member of the Conseil d'État of the canton of Valais – Esther Waeber Kalbermatten – 2009
 Mayor of Zurich – Corine Mauch – 2009

Turkey

Ottoman
 Regent – Kösem Sultan – 1623

Republic
 Mayor of Kılıçkaya, Artvin – Sadiye Hanım – 1930
 muhtar (village head) – Gülkız Ürbül – 1933
 Members of Parliament – Hatı Çırpan and 17 others – 1935
 Mayor (of Mersin) – Müfide İlhan – 1950
 First senator of the senate (upper house) – Mebrure Aksoley – 1964
 First female Turkish party leader for Workers Party of Turkey – Behice Boran – 1970
 Minister of Health – Türkân Akyol – 1971
 First Turkish party founded by a woman, National Women's Party of Turkey – Mübeccel Göktuna Törüner – 1972
 Minister of Culture – Nermin Neftçi – 1974
 First female Ambassador – Filiz Dinçmen – 1982
 Minister of Labor Relations and Social Security – Dr. İmren Aykut – 1987
 Provincial Governor (Muğla Province) – Lale Aytaman – 1991
 Minister of State – Güler İleri – 1991
 Prime Minister (elected) – Tansu Çiller – 1993
 Council of State (Turkey), the highest administrative court in the Republic of Turkey – Füruzan İkincioğulları – 1994
 Minister of Environment – Işılay Saygın – 1996
 Minister of Tourism – Işılay Saygın – 1996
 Minister of the Interior – Dr. Meral Akşener – 1996
 Deputy Premier and Foreign Minister – Tansu Çiller – 1996
 Minister of Justice – Aysel Çelikel – 2002 
 Minister of National Education – Nimet Baş – 2009
 Minister of Family and Social Policies – Fatma Şahin – 2011
 Minister of European Union – Beril Dedeoğlu – 2015

Ukraine

Soviet Socialist Republic
 Government minister and Minister of Interior – Evgenia Bosh – 1918
 Acting Prime Minister – Evgenia Bosh – 1918
 Minister of Education and Science – Alla Bondar – 1962
 Minister of Culture – Z. Rakhimbaeva – 1965 
 Chairperson of the State-Committee of the Protection of Nature – Dina Protsenko – 1975 
 Chairperson of the Presidium of the Supreme Soviet – Valentyna Shevchenko – 1984
 Deputy Premier Minister – Mariya A. Orlik – 1989

Republic
Minister of Justice – Susanna Stanik – 1997
 Minister of Health – Raisa Bogatyrova – 1999
 Prime Minister – Yulia Tymoshenko – 2005
 Minister of Labor and Social Policy – Lyudmila Denysova – 2007
 Minister of Finance – Natalie Jaresko – 2014

United Kingdom

Great Britain
 Monarch – Queen Anne – 1701
 City Council (Poor Board) – Mary Clifford – 1875
 Member of a City Council – Margaret Ashton – 1908
 Mayor (of Aldeburgh) – Elizabeth Garrett Anderson – 1908

Great Britain and Ireland
 Member of Parliament (elected) – Constance Markievicz – 1918
 Member of Parliament (who took her seat) – Nancy Astor – 1919

United Kingdom of Great Britain and Northern Ireland 
 Minister of Labour – Margaret Bondfield – 1929
 Minister for Education – Ellen Wilkinson – 1945
 Member of the House of Lords – Stella Isaacs, Marchioness of Reading – 1958
 Government Whip – Harriet Slater – 1964
 Minister of Pensions and National Insurance – Margaret Herbison – 1964
 Minister of Overseas Development – Barbara Castle – 1964
 Minister for Transport – Barbara Castle – 1965
 First Secretary of State – Barbara Castle – 1968
 Secretary of State for Social Services (Health) – Barbara Castle – 1974
 Leader of the Opposition – Margaret Thatcher – 1975
 Prime Minister – Margaret Thatcher – 1979
 Leader of the House of Lords – Janet Young, Baroness Young – 1981
 Speaker of the House of Commons – Betty Boothroyd – 1992
 Minister of Agriculture, Fisheries and Food – Gillian Shephard – 1993
 Secretary of State for National Heritage (later Culture, Media and Sport) – Virginia Bottomley – 1995
 Secretary of State for Northern Ireland – Mo Mowlam – 1997
 President of the Board of Trade – Margaret Beckett – 1997
 Leader of the House of Commons – Ann Taylor – 1997
 Chief Whip – Ann Taylor – 1998
 Solicitor General for England and Wales – Harriet Harman – 2001
 Secretary of State for Scotland – Helen Liddell – 2001
 Deputy General Secretary of the Trades Union Congress – Frances O'Grady – 2003
 Foreign Secretary – Margaret Beckett – 2006
 Lord Speaker – Helene Hayman, Baroness Hayman – 2006
 Home Secretary – Jacqui Smith – 2007
 Attorney General – Baroness Scotland – 2007
 European Commissioner for Trade – Catherine Ashton – 2008
 Welsh Secretary – Cheryl Gillan – 2010
 General Secretary of the Trades Union Congress – Frances O'Grady – 2013
 Vice-President of the European Commission – Catherine Ashton – 2010
 Lord Chancellor – Liz Truss – 2016
Chairman of Ways and Means – Eleanor Laing – 2020

England

Regent – Edith of Scotland – 12th century
Monarch – Queen Mary I – 1553
Mayor of a town in England (Aldeburgh) – Elizabeth Garrett Anderson – 1908
Lord Mayor of Norwich – Ethel Colman – 1923 
Lord Mayor of Liverpool – Margaret Beavan – 1927
Lord Mayor of Sheffield – Ann Eliza Longden – 1936
Lord Mayor of York – Edna Annie Crichton – 1941
Lord Mayor of Leeds – Jessie Beatrice Kitson – 1942 (succeeded upon the death in office of Arthur Clark)
Lord Mayor of Newcastle-upon-Tyne – Violet Hardisty Grantham – 1952
Lord Mayor of Leeds (elected) – Mary Pearce – 1958
Lord Mayor of Bristol – Florence Mills Brown – 1963
Lord Mayor of Kingston upon Hull – Annie Major – 1965
Lord Mayor of Oxford – Florence Kathleen Lower – 1965
Lord Mayor of Manchester – Nellie Beer – 1966
Lord Mayor of Plymouth – Dorothy F. Innes – 1971
Lord Mayor of Portsmouth – Phyllis Loe – 1972
Lord Mayor of Birmingham – Marjorie Alice Brown – 1973
Lord Mayor of London – Mary Donaldson – 1983
Deputy Mayor of London – Nicky Gavron – 2000
Chair of the London Assembly – Sally Hamwee – 2001
Police and Crime Commissioner – Vera Baird, Ann Barnes, Katy Bourne, Jane Kennedy, Sue Mountstevens – 2012

Northern Ireland

Parliament of Northern Ireland 
 Member of the House of Commons of Northern Ireland – Julia McMordie, Dehra Chichester – 1921
 High Sheriff of Belfast – Julia McMordie – 1928
 Minister of Health for Northern Ireland – Dehra Chichester – 1949
 Lord Mayor of Belfast – Grace Bannister – 1982

Northern Ireland Assembly 
 Health Minister of Northern Ireland – Bairbre de Brún – 1999
 Presiding Officer of the Northern Ireland Assembly – Eileen Bell – 2007
 First Minister – Arlene Foster – 2016
Minister of Justice – Claire Sugden – 2016

Scotland

 Monarch – Margaret I of Scotland – 1286
 Regent – Joan Beaufort, Queen of Scotland – 1437
 Lord Provost– Lavinia Malcolm (in Dollar, Clackmannanshire) – 1913
 Lord Provost of Glasgow – Jean Roberts – 1960
 Lord Provost of Edinburgh – Eleanor McLaughlin – 1988
 Lord Provost of Aberdeen – Margaret Farquhar – 1996
 Lord Provost of Dundee – Helen Wright – 1999
 Solicitor General for Scotland – Elish Angiolini – 2001
 Lord Advocate – Elish Angiolini – 2006
 Leader of the Scottish Conservative Party – Annabel Goldie – 2006
 Deputy First Minister – Nicola Sturgeon – 2007
 Leader of the Scottish Labour Party – Wendy Alexander – 2007
 Foreign Minister – Linda Fabiani – 2007
 Presiding Officer of the Scottish Parliament – Tricia Marwick – 2011
 Leader of the Scottish National Party – Nicola Sturgeon – 2014
 First Minister – Nicola Sturgeon – 2014

Wales

 Lord Mayor of Cardiff – Helena Evans – 1959
 Presiding Officer of the National Assembly for Wales – Jane Davidson – 1999
 Deputy First Minister for Wales – Jenny Randerson – 2001
 Leader of Plaid Cymru – Leanne Wood – 2012

Vatican City

Vice Minister – Sister Enrica Rosanna – 2004
Undersecretary of the Section for Relations with States (Vatican Secretariat of State) – Francesca Di Giovanni – 2020

See also 
 List of women heads of state
 List of the first LGBT holders of political offices

Footnotes and references 

Europe

Europe-related lists
Lists of European politicians
European women in politics